Mooreana is an Indomalayan genus of spread-winged skippers in the family Hesperiidae.

Species
Mooreana boisduvali (Mabille, 1876) Celebes
Mooreana princeps (Semper, 1892) Philippines
Mooreana trichoneura (C. & R. Felder, 1860)

References

External links
Natural History Museum Lepidoptera genus database

Tagiadini
Hesperiidae genera